The short-crested flycatcher (Myiarchus ferox) is a species of bird in the family Tyrannidae.

It is found in Argentina, Bolivia, Brazil, Colombia, Ecuador, French Guiana, Guyana, Paraguay, Peru, Suriname, Uruguay, and Venezuela. Its natural habitats are subtropical or tropical moist lowland forests and heavily degraded former forest.

References

short-crested flycatcher
Birds of South America
short-crested flycatcher
short-crested flycatcher
Taxonomy articles created by Polbot